Night Time may refer to:

The Night Time Podcast, an audio documentary series covering Canadian crime, mysteries, and strange stories
 "Night Time" (song), a 1966 hit by The Strangeloves, covered by The J. Geils Band
 "Night Time" (The xx song), 2009 song by The xx on their xx LP
 Night Time (album), a 1985 LP by Killing Joke

See also
 Night (disambiguation)